Bodyguard is an adventure story arc of the Philippine comic strip series Pugad Baboy, created by Pol Medina Jr. This particular story arc lasts 53 strips long and was published in the Philippine Daily Inquirer from July 2008 to September 2008. In 2009, the story arc was reprinted in the 21st compilation of the comic strip series, named Pugad Baboy 21. The story arc features perennially henpecked husband Tomas Sabaybunot, who appears as the main character for the first time since 1995's Col. Manyakis.

Synopsis
Tomas has been assigned to a VIP security detail. On his first day on the job, Tomas' superior introduces him to Cris, the son of a certain General Caldera, as one of four close-in bodyguards. However, the feeling of being a general's son and having a number of bodyguards gets to the boy's head, as he fears of reprisal by another youth whom he hit on the head with his .45-caliber pistol. The arrogance gets on Tomas' nerves, as he warns the child not to make him his errand boy (after he has asked to buy him a cigarette).

After going home, Tomas receives a call from the base, as Cris was kidnapped and two out of the three other guards were incapacitated. Tomas gets on the case and discovers that the third guard was not around at the time of the incident-Cris asked him to buy a cigarette. Further investigation leads Tomas to the father of Rene, the boy who was hit by Cris' pistol. The man said he already filed a case against Cris, but denies taking him. The two injured bodyguards say that Cris has been kidnapped four times, but his father always pays ransom. At the same time, the kidnapper was also wounded in the shoulder. However, when Tomas decides to talk to the general himself, the family lawyer discourages him because of the personal trauma.

Armed with the bodyguards' clues, Tomas visits a kali training school and asks Rene's father - a kali instructor - to demonstrate some moves that could match how the kidnapping took place. Tomas and Rene's father later question the bodyguards for their story. However, just as the two leave the hospital, a sniper fires at Tomas, forcing the two of them to take cover. Someone from the kali school calls Rene's father and tells him that one of his colleagues was also hit as well. Tomas - who was wearing a flak vest underneath his uniform - determines that since the slugs that hit them are 9mm rounds, the sniper could have used a VSS Vintorez or VSK-94. Alarmed at the danger, he asks Barbie and Paltik to go into hiding in Pampanga. However, Tomas' superior tells him that the general has put out a restraining order on him, claiming that he kidnapped Cris.

Determined to seek the truth, Tomas and Rene's father suit up in full battle gear and infiltrate the Caldera house, with the family lawyer's "cooperation." The lawyer admits that he is in charge of manipulating the Calderas' financial records. They finally see the general himself, supposedly comatose and connected to a respirator and a heart monitor, but when Rene's father quips that the family may have hired the team responsible for maintaining Apong Ferdie's body, Tomas deduces that the general is already dead.  

Rene's father and Tomas determine that while the general is dead, the family decided not to bury him so they could still receive pensions, allowing Cris to continue flaunting his wealth. However, the lawyer confirms that Cris was truly kidnapped this time around and Tomas has him arrange a meeting. The three escape the house after the security forces are alerted and head for an abandoned building in Binondo, where the meeting is scheduled to take place. Tomas sees snipers in the area and plans the assault with Rene's father. They start the attack but Rene's father senses that the defenders painted the windows and turned off the lights so they could use night-vision goggles. At this point, it is revealed that the man is actually Dado (see Aso), who single-handedly takes down the opposing force as a werewolf. Since the situation is a mess, Dado calls up Polgas to assist in policing the area.

Tomas, Dado, Polgas, and the lawyer meet the injured bodyguards. Tomas proposes that the scam be kept under wraps and declare Cris a fugitive in exchange for General Caldera being buried with full honors. However, when the bodyguards recognize one of Dado's kali knives as the one used in the kidnapping, Rene finally appears and admits that he kidnapped Cris as revenge for the pistol-whipping.

Rene explains that he escaped the hospital and tracked down Cris, whom he brought to Dado's veterinary clinic. He instructed the "patients" not to let him escape. When the group finds Cris at the clinic, the supposed abductee claims his father will come down hard on them, but shuts up after Dado asks him how he can summon the general from the dead. Using reverse psychology, Tomas gives Rene a chance to return Cris the favor. Dado finally says that since Cris drew first blood by hitting Rene, it was enough that he be punished by no longer abusing his father's wealth and status. Rene becomes friends with Cris and offers him a chance to train at the kali school. Polgas, Tomas, and Dado later settle for a drinking session with Igno, where they intend to use Dado's alter ego in scaring him.

Continuity
Dado, upon reuniting with Polgas, goes on to explain what has happened since the events of Aso. He managed to "convince" the magic mushroom farmers to cease their production and instead, produce coffee. As for his profession as a veterinarian, like the former story-arc-only character Father Marty before him, he has moved to Manila, possibly to Pugad Baboy, and opened a clinic there.
It is also revealed that Dado managed to beget a son, despite his lycanthropy, though it is unclear if Rene was conceived before or after the events of Aso. How much of Dado's lycanthropy was passed on to Rene is unknown, though it is shown that he is also able to communicate with dogs.
Dado can now transform at will, unlike in Aso that he cannot find the cure.

Real-life references
Dado's remark about General Caldera's body is a reference to the refrigerated remains of Ferdinand Marcos' body at the Marcos Museum in Ilocos Norte. "Apong Ferdie" is a portmanteau of the Ilocano term of endearment "apo" and one of Marcos' nicknames.
Tomas cited the disappearances of Rolando Galman's wife, girlfriend, and girlfriend's sibling as his rationale for having Barbie and Paltik go into hiding.
Tomas calls Cris an Anak ng Diyos (Son of God), a Filipino slang term for the children of highly placed officials (in this case, generals) who turn out to be spoiled brats.

Bibliography
Medina, Pol. Pugad Baboy 21, Pol Medina Jr Novelties, 2009. 

Pugad Baboy